Brian Cabell White is an American mathematician who specializes in differential geometry and geometric measure theory. He is a professor of mathematics and former chair of the mathematics department at Stanford University. He played a key role in the solution of the double bubble conjecture, that the minimum-area enclosure of two volumes is formed from three spherical patches meeting in a circle and forming dihedral angles of 2/3 with each other, by proving that the optimal solution to this problem is necessarily a surface of revolution.

White graduated from Yale University in 1977, as the top student in the sciences at Yale. He earned his Ph.D. from Princeton University in 1982, with a dissertation on minimal surfaces supervised by Frederick J. Almgren, Jr. After postdoctoral research at the Courant Institute of Mathematical Sciences of New York University, he became a faculty member at Stanford in 1983.

He was awarded a Sloan Research Fellowship in 1985, and a Guggenheim Fellowship in 1999. He was an invited speaker at the International Congress of Mathematicians in 2002, speaking in the differential geometry section on the curve-shortening flow and mean curvature flow. In 2012, he was selected as one of the inaugural fellows of the American Mathematical Society.

References

Year of birth missing (living people)
Living people
20th-century American mathematicians
21st-century American mathematicians
Differential geometers
Yale College alumni
Princeton University alumni
Stanford University faculty
Fellows of the American Mathematical Society
Sloan Research Fellows